Paul Vincent Elzey (May 13, 1946 - September 29, 1989) was an American football Linebacker who played one season for the Cincinnati Bengals of the NFL. He was drafted in the 5th round (126) by the Baltimore Colts in the 1968 NFL Draft.

References

1946 births
1989 deaths
Cincinnati Bengals players
Players of American football from Ohio
American football linebackers
Toledo Rockets football players
Sportspeople from Toledo, Ohio